Gastronyssidae is a family of acariform mites which live as parasites on birds and mammals.

References
Gastronyssidae at Systema Naturae 2000

Sarcoptiformes
Acari families